David Gary Hathcock (born July 20, 1943) is a former American football defensive back in the National Football League (NFL) for the Green Bay Packers and the New York Giants.  He played college football as a linebacker at the University of Memphis and was drafted by the Packers in the 17th round (258th overall) of the 1966 NFL Draft.

He currently teaches drafting at Hunters Lane Comprehensive High School in Nashville, Tennessee.

1943 births
Living people
People from Memphis, Tennessee
American football defensive backs
American football linebackers
Green Bay Packers players
New York Giants players